The NHS Apps Library was a collection of health-related online tools and apps for devices typically using the Android and iOS operating systems.  It was created in April 2017 and  run by the UK National Health Service (NHS).

Apps were not necessarily originated by the NHS, but were assessed against a range of NHS standards. Most, but not all, apps and services were available without charge; some required a referral from a healthcare practitioner.

It was discontinued in December 2021 with the website stating "We have decided to close the NHS Apps Library and instead we will link to recommended apps throughout the NHS website."

References

National Health Service
Medical software